Marwood is a surname. It originates from either the Norman French word 'malreward', a nickname given to someone who 'casts an evil eye' or the two places named Marwood in England. The first record of the name appears in the register of Rievaulx Abbey as Richard Malregard in 1170.

It may refer to:

Alex Marwood, pseudonym of Serena Mackesy
Anthony Marwood (b. 1979), British solo violinist
Arthur Pierson Marwood (1868–1916), English mathematician upon whom the character of Christopher Tietjens was based
Ben Marwood, English singer-songwriter 
Brian Marwood (b. 1960), English footballer
Sir George Marwood, 1st Baronet (1601–1680), English peer who served as High Sheriff of Yorkshire
Sir Henry Marwood, 2nd Baronet (1635–1725), English peer, politician and Yorkshire landowner
James Marwood (born 1990), English footballer 
Louise Marwood (born 1979), English actress and comedian 
William Marwood (1820-1883), British hangman
William Francis Marwood (1863-1935), English peer and civil servant